Conlyde Luchanga is a Zambian professional footballer who plays as a forward for Forest Rangers F.C.

Club career
Luchanga played club football for Power Dynamos F.C., and had a brief loan spell with Hapoel Ra'anana. He left the club in 2017 and joined rivals Lusaka Dynamos F.C.

International career

International goals
Scores and results list Zambia's goal tally first.

References

External links 
 

1997 births
Living people
Zambian footballers
Zambia international footballers
Power Dynamos F.C. players
Lusaka Dynamos F.C. players
Hapoel Ra'anana A.F.C. players
Expatriate footballers in Israel
Zambian expatriate sportspeople in Israel
Israeli Premier League players
2015 Africa U-23 Cup of Nations players
Association football forwards
People from Ndola
Zambia A' international footballers
2016 African Nations Championship players